Qushjeh (also Romanized as Qūshjeh; also known as Ghooshjeh, Khushāja, Qowshājā, Qowshajeh, and Qūshāchā) is a village in Mehraban-e Olya Rural District, Shirin Su District, Kabudarahang County, Hamadan Province, Iran. At the 2006 census, its population was 167, in 36 families.

References 

Populated places in Kabudarahang County